Svetlogorsk Urban Settlement is the name of several municipal formations in Russia.

Modern entities
Svetlogorsk Urban Settlement, a municipal formation which the town of district significance of Svetlogorsk in Svetlogorsky District of Kaliningrad Oblast is incorporated as

Historical entities

See also
Svetlogorsk (disambiguation)
Svetlogorsky (disambiguation)

References

Notes

Sources

